Robert Bauld (14 March 1902 – 19 October 1980) was a Scottish professional footballer who played as a left half and inside forward. He played in the Scottish Football League for Raith Rovers and Dundee United, and in the English Football League for Bradford City and Chesterfield.

Career
Born in Cowdenbeath, Bauld was the son of the colliery under-manager at nearby Glencraig. He played junior football for Glencraig Celtic and began to attract the attention of a number of senior clubs. In October 1920 he appeared as a trialist for St Bernard's in a Central League match against Dundee Hibernian and was reported to have "played well" at right back. Later that month, Bauld was also due to play as a trialist for Cowdenbeath in the Central League, but missed the chance due to suspension after he was sent off playing for Glencraig.

On 4 December 1920, Bauld "gave a satisfactory display" turning out for a Scottish Select in a junior international trial match against Dumbartonshire at Clydeholm, Clydebank. He was then selected to appear in a further trial match, for the Rest of Scotland against Glasgow at Firhill Park, Glasgow on 4 January 1921. His performance at Clydebank also led to further interest from senior clubs, with approaches from Raith Rovers and Celtic before Bauld agreed to appear for Rangers "A" in a Scottish Alliance fixture against Ayr United "A". He also had a trial with Tottenham Hotspur before signing for Raith Rovers in January 1921. Bauld made his Scottish League debut for Raith in a 1–0 victory over Aberdeen at Stark's Park on 8 January 1921, when he "gave a sterling exhibition in his first senior game".

Bauld moved from Raith to Dundee United on 31 October 1923 for a fee of £100. He scored 30 goals in 143 games across all competitions for them. He moved to Bradford City in July 1927, for a transfer fee of £350. He scored 34 goals in 217 appearances for them in the English Football League, as well as scoring 1 goal in 10 FA Cup appearances. He moved to Chesterfield in May 1935, making a further 2 league appearances before retiring.

Sources

References

1902 births
1980 deaths
Scottish footballers
St Bernard's F.C. players
Raith Rovers F.C. players
Dundee United F.C. players
Bradford City A.F.C. players
Chesterfield F.C. players
People from Cowdenbeath
Association football wing halves
Association football inside forwards
Scottish Football League players
English Football League players
Scottish Junior Football Association players
Footballers from Fife
Glencraig Celtic F.C. players